Tanauan, officially the City of Tanauan, is a 2nd class component city in the province of Batangas, Philippines. According to the 2020 census, it has a population of 193,936 people.

It is incorporated as a city under Republic Act No. 9005, signed on February 2, 2001, and ratified on March 10, 2001.

With the continuous expansion of Metro Manila, the city is now part of Manila's conurbation which reaches Lipa in its southernmost part. The city shares its borders with Calamba, Laguna, to the north, Tagaytay City, Cavite, to the northwest, Talisay to the west, Santo Tomas City to the east, and the towns of Balete and Malvar to the south. It borders on Taal Lake to the west. The town is known for the Old Tanauan Church Ruins, the most important archaeological site in the municipality where human remains from the colonial era have been unearthed.

Among those born in Tanauan are revolutionary former Prime Minister Apolinario Mabini and former President José P. Laurel.

History 
Tanauan (lookout point) was founded by the Augustinians in 1584 on the northwestern bay of Lake Taal, called Tanauan Bay.  Lookout towers were associated with 16th and 17th century churches to forewarn of Moro raids.  "Old Tanauan" (Lumang Tanauan) included such a watch tower and associated sapao (built-up structures in the water).  The 1754 eruption of Taal Volcano forced the town inhabitants to move initially to Sala.  Then both towns moved again later that year to Tanauan's current location, in which Sala is now a barrio.

Tanaueños have displayed characteristics of personal independence and nationalism since early history. The town is called the cradle of noble heroes due to its contribution to the revolutionary movement of its sons Apolinario Mabini, the brains of Katipunan, and later by the statesman Jose P. Laurel. Also, three Tanaueños served as governors of Batangas, namely: Jose P. Laurel V, Modesto Castillo and Nicolas Gonzales.

Recent events include the assassination of its former mayor, Cesar V. Platon, by NPA rebels on May 7, 2001, as he was running for the governorship of Batangas.  This happened a few days before the election. On July 2, 2018, then-incumbent mayor Antonio Halili, noted for public humiliation campaigns against criminals and drug pushers, was assassinated during the flag raising ceremony at the city hall.

Cityhood

The Congress approved the then Batangas 3rd District Rep. Jose Macario Laurel IV's bill and a Senate counterpart measure on December 19, 2000 the Republic Act No. 9005 known as "The Charter of the City of Tanauan."

On February 2, 2001, President Gloria Macapagal Arroyo signed it into law.

On March 10, 2001, on Saturday, the charter was approved by a referendum in Tanauan that drew 8,890 or 16% of the 55,453 registered voters. Two ballots were either spoiled or blank. The "yes" had it over the "no" by a landslide, 7,026 to 1,961.

According to cityhood advocates, quoted in reports reaching Batangas on Sunday, the turnout, despite being two times better than previous conversion-to-city exercises, was still only 16%.

Geography 

Climate

Demographics

Barangays
Tanauan City is politically subdivided into 48 barangays.

Religion

Roman Catholicism is the most dominant and visible religion in Tanauan. St. John the Evangelist is its patron, and its main church is the St. John the Evangelist Parish. La Consolacion College Tanauan (formerly Our Lady of Fatima Academy, 1948), run by the Augustinian Sisters of Our Lady of Consolation, is the first Catholic school in the city. Other Catholic schools include Our Lady of Assumption Montessori School and Daughters of Mary Immaculate School (lay-operated). First Asia Institute is converting from a non-sectarian school to a Catholic (Christian) school.

Iglesia ni Cristo, Jehovah's Witnesses, Mormons (The Church of Jesus Christ of Latter-day Saints), Islam and other religious groups are also present in the city.

Economy 

Tanauan is known as an agricultural trading center of Calabarzon. Agri products from Calabarzon and as far as the Mimaropa and Bicol regions are being sent here before it reaches Metro Manila public markets. Aside from being an important agricultural center, Tanauan is also one of the Philippines' major industrial centers nowadays hosting four industrial parks which is home to various multinational companies and tourism facilities.

Transportation

Public transport
Jeepneys serve the city and the nearby municipalities and barangays. Tricycles provide transportation on the barangays. Buses connect the city with Manila and Batangas City.

Roads

The Southern Tagalog Arterial Road passes at the central part of the city. The expressway connects the city with the rest of Batangas. Jose P. Laurel Highway connects the city to Calamba and Santo Tomas on the north and with Malvar, Lipa, and Batangas City to the south. Another highway links Tanauan with Talisay and Tagaytay. A  service road on both sides of STAR Tollway will connect the northeastern barangays of Tanauan to the southeastern barangays of the city 

Aside from the STAR Tollway, national roads like the Jose P.  Laurel Highway (Route 4) and Tanauan – Talisay Road (Route 421) serves also the city. The city also maintains roads that connects the rural barangays of the city.

Education

Among the tertiary educational establishments in Tanauan is the First Asia Institute of Technology and Humanities, La Consolacion College, Christian College of Tanauan, Nova Schola, the STI Academic Center, the DMMC Institute of Health Sciences, and the Tanauan Institute. The Tanauan Institute is the oldest private education institution in the city having been established in 1924. The Sapphire International Aviation Academy which caters to aspiring aircraft pilots is also located within the city at the Barradas Airstrip.

There are 9 private and 16 public high schools, and 27 private and 44 public elementary schools.

Public High Schools 
 Balele Integrated High School
 Banjo Laurel National High School
 Bernardo Lirio Memorial National High School
 Boot National High School
 Dr. Alcantara National High School
 Janopol Oriental National High School
 Luyos National High School
 Malaking Pulo National High School
 Natatas National High School
 Pantay National High School
 President Jose P. Laurel National High School
 Tanauan City Integrated High School
 Tanauan School of Fisheries
 Tinurik National High School
 Ulango Integrated High School
 Wawa National High School

Government
The current seat of government of the city is the New Tanauan City Hall located at Laurel Hill, Barangay Natatas, Tanauan City.

Elected Officials

Heads of government

Notable personalities
Antonio Halili (Former Mayor)
Jose P. Laurel (Former President of the Philippines; Former Senate President, Former Associate Justice of the Philippines; Founder, Lyceum of the Philippines – LPU Manila)
Jose Laurel Jr. (Former Speaker of the House)
Apolinario Mabini (The Great Paralytic)
Salvador Laurel (Former Vice President of the Philippines)
Sotero Laurel (Former Senator/Founder, Lyceum of the Philippines University Batangas & Laguna)
Arsenio Laurel, 2-time Macao Grand Prix Champion
Zanjoe Marudo (actor, ABS-CBN)
Jade Lopez (actress, GMA 7)
Renato Corona (Former Chief Justice, 2010–2012)
El Gamma Penumbra
Carlo Pagulayan (cartoonist, Marvel Heroes)
Mary Angeline Halili, (daughter of late former mayor Antonio Halili, politician)
Joshua Garcia (actor, ABS-CBN)
Diane Querrer (TV Host and News Anchor, PTV4)
Ka Louie Tabing (veteran broadcaster, "Sa Kabukiran) (DZMM 630)
Christian C. Javier, Arena Chess Grandmaster - 2018, ICCF Correspondence Chess Expert - 2021, Correspondence Chess Master - 2022 FIDE International Chess Organizer - 2021, National Arbiter of the Phils. - 2012, FIDE National Arbiter of Phils. - 2013.

Gallery

References

External links

 
 [ Philippine Standard Geographic Code]
 Philippine Census Information
 

 
Cities in Batangas
Populated places established in 1754
1754 establishments in the Philippines
Populated places on Taal Lake
Component cities in the Philippines